The Stag Pale Pilseners were a Philippine Basketball League (PBL) team  owned by Asia Brewery, Inc., a company owned by the Lucio Tan group. It joined the league in 1995. The team was renamed Tanduay Gold Rhum Masters in 1997 and remained with the league until 1999. The franchise was the most dominant team during its PBL stint, playing in the finals in all 10 participated conferences, winning seven championships, including a grand slam finish in its debut year (1995) and four consecutive titles from 1996 to 1998.

The franchise transferred to the Philippine Basketball Association in 1999, becoming the second incarnation of Tanduay in the PBA. The Lucio Tan group would return to the Philippine Basketball League in 2009 when it took over the Bacchus Energy Drink Raiders/Warriors and renamed the team as the Cobra Energy Drink Iron Men.

Roster

1995 season

1997-1998 season

See also
Tanduay Rhum Masters
Cobra Energy Drink Iron Men
Manila Beer Brewmasters

References

External links

Former Philippine Basketball League teams